Horst Queck (born 5 October 1943 in Steinach, Thuringia) is an East German former ski jumper who competed from 1966 to 1971.

Queck's best individual finish was second in the individual normal hill event in Austria in 1970. He is unrelated to the Olympic ski jumper Manfred Queck.

References

1943 births
Living people
People from Sonneberg (district)
German male ski jumpers
Sportspeople from Thuringia